Germon is a surname. Notable people with the surname include:

Effie Germon (1845–1914), American actress
Lee Germon (born 1968), New Zealand cricketer
Nane Germon (1909–2001), French actress

See also
Germond